Gymnosphaera commutata is a Malesian species of tree fern found in wet and swampy forests.

Description
The trunk is erect and rarely taller than 3 m. Fronds are bipinnate and 1–2 m long. Characteristically of this species, the lowest pair of pinnae are usually reduced and occur towards the base of the stipe. The stipe itself is dark and bears dark, glossy basal scales with thin, fragile edges. Fertile pinnules are notably smaller than sterile ones. Sori occur near the fertile pinnule midvein and lack indusia.

Distribution and habitat

References

Cyatheaceae
Flora of Sumatra
Flora of Peninsular Malaysia
Flora of Borneo